Sarcomelicope simplicifolia, commonly known as bauerella, hard aspen or yellow-wood, is a species of flowering plant in the family Rutaceae and is endemic to eastern Australia including Lord Howe and Norfolk Islands. It is a shrub or small tree with elliptic to egg-shaped leaves arranged in opposite pairs, male or female flowers arranged in small groups in leaf axils and fruit an oval to spherical drupe.

Description 
It has a cylindrical trunk with corky and fissured bark.

Taxonomy
Bauerella was first formally described in 1833 by Stephan Endlicher in his book Prodromus Florae Norfolkicae and was given the name Vepris simplicifolia from specimens collected on Norfolk Island. In 1982 Thomas Gordon Hartley changed the name to Sarcomelicope simplicifolia and described the subspecies simplicifolia in the Australian Journal of Botany. The name of the subspecies is accepted by the Australian Plant Census.

Distribution and habitat
Sarcomelicope simplicifolia subsp. simplicifolia grows in, and on the margins of warmer rainforest from near Mount Carbine area in tropical north Queensland to Mount Dromedary in south-eastern New South Wales. It is also found on Norfolk Island and Lord Howe Island.

Subspecies neoscotia occurs in New Caledonia and Vanuatu.

Ecology
The fruit is eaten by a variety of birds, including green catbird and white headed pigeon.

Use in horticulture
Regeneration from seed is not easily achieved. Seeds should be removed from the flesh, then soaked for a week or two. After six months, around half of these may send out roots and shoots.

References

simplicifolia
Trees of Australia
Sapindales of Australia
Flora of New South Wales
Flora of Queensland
Flora of Lord Howe Island
Flora of Norfolk Island
Plants described in 1833
Taxa named by Stephan Endlicher